Senator Lane may refer to:

Members of the United States Senate
Harry Lane (1855–1917), U.S. Senator from Oregon from 1913 to 1917
Henry Smith Lane (1811–1881), U.S. Senator from Indiana from 1861 to 1867
James Henry Lane (Union general) (1814–1866), U.S. Senator from Kansas from 1861 to 1866
Joseph Lane (1801–1881), U.S. Senator from Oregon from 1859 to 1861

United States state senate members
Christopher M. Lane (fl. 1990s), Massachusetts State Senate
James Tyson Lane (1835–1885), Louisiana State Senate
John W. Lane (1835–1888), Texas State Senate
Julian Lane (1914–1997), Florida State Senate
Thomas J. Lane (1898–1994), Massachusetts State Senate
William J. Lane (1905–1976), Pennsylvania State Senate